Journal of Natural and Applied Sciences is a triannual peer-reviewed academic journal affiliated with the SDU Institute of Natural and Applied Sciences. The journal was founded in 1995.

The journal is abstracted in Zentralblatt MATH, Chemical Abstract, CAB Abstract and EBSCO Host.

References

External links
 http://fenbilimleri.sdu.edu.tr/dergi/indexi.html

Triannual journals
Publications established in 1995
Süleyman Demirel University
Multidisciplinary scientific journals
Multilingual journals